Pātālekhet (Newar: पातालेखेत; Nepali: पात्लेखेत, Pātlekhet) is a village development committee in Kavrepalanchok District in the Bagmati Zone of central Nepal. At the time of the 1991 Nepal census it had a population of 3,516 in 621 individual households.

References

External links
UN map of the municipalities of Kavrepalanchowk District

Populated places in Kavrepalanchok District